

Events
March 24 – First performance of Fredrik Pacius' opera Kung Karls jakt, the first to be composed in Finland, in Helsinki with a Swedish language libretto by Zachris Topelius.
May 15 – Teatro Comunale Alighieri, the opera house in Ravenna, is inaugurated with a production of Meyerbeer's Robert le diable followed by Giovanni Pacini's Medea.
Michael William Balfe sets off for Danzig to visit his daughter.
 Charles Gounod improvises a melody over the C major Prelude from Book 1 of Bach's Well Tempered Clavier. It is published the next year as 'Méditation sur le Premier Prélude de Piano de S. Bach' later to be known as Ave Maria.
Franz Liszt conducts a performance of the 1838 opera Benvenuto Cellini by Hector Berlioz at Weimar. This revives the French composer's career which has been stagnant. 
 The earliest known performance of Wagner's music in the United States takes place as an arrangement of one of the finales from Tannhäuser is performed by the Germania Musical Society conducted by Carl Bergmann.

Popular music
Stephen Foster – "Massa's in de Cold Cold Ground"
S.M. Grannis – "Do They Miss Me At Home?" (lyrics by Carolina A.Mason)
John Howson  – "Christmas Present Polka"
Gustav Reichardt – "Des Deutschen Vaterland" (words by Ernst Moritz Arndt)
author unknown
 "Norah and Dermot"
"Lundu"

Classical music

Johannes Brahms – Piano Sonata No. 2
Matteo Carcassi – Etudes, Op.60
Niels Gade – Symphony No.5, Op.25
Mikhail Glinka – Mazurka in C major
Stefano Golinelli – 24 Preludes, Op.69
Alfred Jaell – Reminiscences sur 'Norma', Op.20
Theodore Kirchner – 20 Piano Pieces, Op.2
Franz Liszt – Fantasie und Fuge über den Choral Ad nos, ad salutarem undam, S.259
Joachim Raff – Zwei Lieder with words by Gotthold Logau
Luigi Ricci – Tarantella Napoletana from the opera "La Festa di Piedigrotta".
Johann Strauss, Jr. 
Orakel-Sprüche Walzer, Op. 90
Maskenfest-Quadrille, Op. 92
Kaiser-Jäger-Marsch, Op. 93
Rhadamantus-Klänge Walzer, Op. 94
Promenade-Quadrille, Op. 98
Frauenkäferln Walzer, Op. 99
Vöslauer Polka, Op. 100
Mephistos Höllenrufe Walzer, Op. 101
Albion-Polka, Op. 102
Vivat! Quadrille, Op. 103
Windsor-Klänge Walzer, Op. 104
5 Paragraphe aus dem Walzer Codex, Op. 105
Harmonie-Polka, Op. 106
Großfürsten-Marsch, Op. 107
Die Unzertrennlichen Walzer, Op. 108
Tête-à-Tête-Quadrille, Op. 109
Elektro-magnetische Polka, Op. 110
Blumenfest-Polka, Op. 111
Melodien-Quadrille, Op. 112
Sachsen-Kürassier-Marsch, Op. 113
Liebes-Lieder Walzer, Op. 114
Wiener Jubel-Gruss-Marsch, Op. 115
Hofball-Quadrille, Op. 116
Annen-Polka, Op. 117
Lockvögel Walzer, Op. 118
William Vincent Wallace 
Fantasie elegante sur des themes de 'Don Pasquale'
Happy Birdling of the Forest, Op. 63
Henri Wieniawski 
Polonaise de concert, Op. 4
Adagio élégiaque, Op. 5
Violin Concerto No.1, Op. 14

Opera
Fromental Halévy – La Juif errant
Fredrik Pacius – Kung Karls jakt

Births
January 8 – Maurice Kufferath, editor and conductor (died 1919)
January 26 – Frederick Corder, translator and composer (died 1932)
January 29 – Sir Frederic Hymen Cowen, pianist, conductor and composer (d. 1935) 
February 17 – Hans Bischoff, pianist and musician (died 1889)
March 6 – Josef Bayer, composer and music director (d. 1913)
April 5 – Franz Eckert, bandmaster and composer (d. 1916)
April 14 – Henrique Oswald, composer (d. 1931)
May 23 – Mathilda Grabow, opera singer (d. 1940)
June 23 – Raoul Pugno, organist, pianist and composer (d. 1914)
June 28 – Hans Huber, composer (d. 1921) 
July 3 – Rafael Joseffy, pianist and composer (d. 1915)
July 4 –  Alfred Grünfeld, arranger and composer (died 1924)
July 6
John Albert Delany composer, conductor (d. 1907)
Otto Neitzel, composer and pianist (d. 1920)
José Jackson Veyán, librettist (died 1935)
August 13 – Robert Hausmann, cellist (died 1909)
September 18 – Francis Money-Coutts, 5th Baron Latymer, librettist (died 1923)
September 30 – Sir Charles Villiers Stanford, composer (d. 1924)
October 12 – Max Friedlaender, German musicologist (died 1934)
November 21 – Francisco Tárrega, guitarist and composer (d. 1909)
November 23 – James Kwast, pianist (died 1927)
date unknown – George Barnet Gardiner, folk song collector (died 1910)

Deaths
February 25 – Thomas Moore, poet and songwriter (b. 1779)
March 5 – Sophie Gay, librettist (b. 1776)
March 7 – Jacopo Ferretti, librettist (b. 1784)
March 15 – Antoine de Lhoyer, guitarist and composer (b. 1768)
June 6 – Tommaso Marchesi, composer (b. 1773)
July 5 – Mikhail Zagoskin, lyricist and librettist (born 1789)
July 17 – Salvadore Cammarano, librettist (b. 1801)
August 17 – Sveinbjörn Egilsson, lyricist (born 1791)
September 20 – Anton Weidinger, trumpet virtuoso (b. 1767)
October 6 – Stephen Codman, composer (b. 1796)
November 12 – Georg Hellmesberger, Jr., violinist and composer (b. 1830)
date unknown – Ulrika Åberg, ballerina (b. 1771)

References

 
19th century in music
Music by year